The 2015 Four National Figure Skating Championships included the Czech Republic, Slovakia, Poland, and Hungary. The event was held in December 2014 in Budapest, Hungary. Skaters competed in the disciplines of men's singles, ladies' singles, pair skating, and ice dancing.

The three highest-placing skaters from each country formed their national podiums. The results were among the criteria used to determine international assignments. It was the seventh consecutive season that the Czech Republic, Slovakia, and Poland held their national championships together and the second season that Hungary participated.

Medals summary

Czech Republic

Slovakia

Poland

Hungary

Senior results

Men

Ladies

Ice dancing

References

External links
 2015 Four National Championships results
 2015 Four National Championships at the Hungarian Skating Association
 2015 Four National Championships at the Slovak Figure Skating Association
 Polish Figure Skating Association

Four Nationals Figure Skating Championships
Czech Figure Skating Championships
Slovak Figure Skating Championships
Polish Figure Skating Championships
Hungarian Figure Skating Championships
Four Nationals Figure Skating Championships
Four Nationals Figure Skating Championships
Four Nationals Figure Skating Championships
Four Nationals Figure Skating Championships